Sasha Williams may refer to:
 Sasha Williams (actress), played the Yellow Lightspeed Ranger in Power Rangers Lightspeed Rescue
 Sasha Williams (The Walking Dead), a fictional character in the TV series The Walking Dead